Bergviken is a residential area in Luleå, Sweden. It had 3,231 inhabitants in 2010.

References

External links
Bergviken at Luleå Municipality

Luleå